Trigonometry is the second album by Saafir, under the alias Mr. No No. It was released on January 20, 1998, on Wrap Records and featured production from Saafir and Shock G.

Track listing
"I'm Saafir (The Saucee Nomad)"- 4:08 
"Major Knock"- 4:48 
"Goin' Home"- 4:53 
"Stay Hi"- 4:08 
"J.Z. Theme"- 3:42 
"Broad Minded"- 4:56 
"Sendin-U-Signals"- 4:06 
"Street Scene"- 4:13 
"Birthday Suit"- 3:02 
"Just Ridin'"- 3:48 
"In a Vest"- 4:15 
"Rock the Show"- 4:30

Samples
"Street Scene"
"UFO" by ESG
"Memory Lane" by Minnie Riperton
"Major Knock"
"I Love to Singa" by Cab Calloway and Al Jolson
"Fly, Robin, Fly" by Silver Convention

References

1998 albums
Saafir albums
Ichiban Records albums